Jan Michael Barrett (November 13, 1939 – October 7, 1973) was an American college and professional football player.  He played college football at California State University, Fresno, where he was an offensive end.  He was signed by the Green Bay Packers in 1962, and played professionally in the American Football League for the Oakland Raiders in 1963 and 1964.

Barrett was killed on Lake Ming, California, while attempting to break a drag boat world speed record.  On his final run he reached a speed of 154.10 miles per hour, just short of the world record of 155 miles per hour.

References

See also
List of American Football League players

1939 births
1973 deaths
Motorboat racers who died while racing
Oakland Raiders players
Sports deaths in California
Sportspeople from Santa Barbara, California
Players of American football from California
Green Bay Packers players
Fresno State Bulldogs football players
American Football League players